The 1983 Professional Players Tournament was a professional ranking snooker tournament which took place between 3 September and 21 October 1983.

In a change from the previous year, the event was hosted at one venue, the 600-seater Redwood Lodge in Bristol. The following year, it would be renamed as the Grand Prix.

The event started on 10 October, the day after the finish of the International Open at Newcastle-upon-Tyne. Cliff Thorburn, a finalist in the International Open, had to travel overnight to Bristol for his first match the following morning, but won against Vic Harris 5–1. World number one Steve Davis was beaten 5–2 at the last-32 stage by Mike Hallett.

Willie Thorne reached his first major semi-final after beating Eugene Hughes 5–2 in the quarter-finals. Hughes had reached the quarter-finals after beating Bill Werbeniuk 5–0 and then Terry Griffiths 5–2 at the last-16 stage.

Joe Johnson reached the first ranking final of his four-year professional career, defeating Pascal Burke, Jimmy White, Eddie Charlton, Cliff Thorburn and Tony Meo. His opponent Tony Knowles reached his second ranking final, overcoming Paul Medati, Rex Williams, Silvino Francisco, John Campbell and Willie Thorne.

In the final, Knowles dominated most of the match, building a 6–1 lead. Johnson then made the highest break of the tournament, a 135, in recovering to a score of 5–7 and eventually levelled the match at 8–8. Knowles won the deciding frame on the colours, to prevail 9–8, winning the first prize of £12,500. Johnson won £7,500 as runner-up and £1,000 for the high break prize.

Main draw

Final

Century breaks

 135, 117, 111  Joe Johnson
 122  John Campbell
 112, 100  Eugene Hughes
 102  Tony Knowles

References

1983
Professional Players Tournament
Professional Players Tournament
Professional Players Tournament
Professional Players Tournament